Margarita Mora (1920–1976) was a Dominican dancer and film actress who became known for her roles in the Golden Age of Mexican cinema.

Selected filmography
 Heads or Tails (1937)
 The Cemetery of the Eagles (1939)
 Simón Bolívar (1942)
 El Ametralladora (1943)

References

Bibliography
 Joanne Hershfield. The Invention of Dolores Del Rio. U of Minnesota Press, 2000.

External links

1920 births
1976 deaths
Venezuelan film actresses
Venezuelan emigrants to Mexico
People from Santo Domingo
Dominican Republic emigrants to Venezuela